Leuciscus chuanchicus is a species of ray-finned fish in the genus Leuciscus which is endemic to China where it occurs in the upper reaches of the Yellow River.

References 

Leuciscus
Taxa named by Karl Kessler
Fish described in 1876